Phoebus High School is a public high school in Hampton, Virginia. Named after the neighborhood and former town of Phoebus, it is the newest of the four high schools in Hampton City Schools. It is considered unique for the IDEA Academy which includes Video Media Design, Engineering, and Video Game Programming. Phoebus continues to add nationally board certified teachers and several students have earned industry certifications via the CTE department.

History
Phoebus High School opened in 1975 as the newest high school in the City of Hampton, Virginia. It was designed as an "Open-Concept" school: Permanent interior walls were minimized in favor of partitions that could be adjusted depending on building needs. This was a popular trend in many schools built in the 1970s.

Recent upgrades include interior walls, lights and switches, a renovation of the gymnasium and theater as well as the main entrances to the school.

Today Phoebus is home of Hampton City Schools' "Behind the Wheel" program.

Feeder pattern
Barron Elementary
Bryan Elementary
Jones Middle School
Kilgore Gifted Center
 Syms Middle School

Demographics

2004-2005 school year
 68% Black
 29% White
 2% Hispanic
 1% Other

2014-2015
 71% Black
 22% White
 0.5% Asian
 3% Hispanic
 2% two or more
 1.5% Other

Athletics
Phoebus' athletic teams are known as the Phantoms. Recently, the Phantom varsity football team has gained a significant amount of attention, having won seven VHSL State Division 5 Championships in 11 years, including five in six seasons and four straight (2001, '02, '06, '08, '09, '10, '11). On December 12, 2009, Phoebus defeated Stone Bridge 15-10 at Scott Stadium, on the campus of the University of Virginia. A year later, they defeated Stone Bridge in a rematch, by a score of 36-17. In 2011, the Phantoms beat South County 20-10.

In December 2018, the Phantoms lost their first ever football state championship, falling to Heritage High School. The final score was 24-20. In December 2021 Phoebus won its eighth championship, defeating Liberty Christian Academy 22-14.

Among notable college players to graduate from Phoebus are running back Elan Lewis and linebacker Xavier Adibi. Adibi was with the Houston Texans. Phoebus quarterback (for 08-09 school year), Tajh Boyd, was the MVP for the Army Allstars football team.

The Phoebus track team was an extreme contender with Crystal Peterson ranked third in the state in the 55m dash, and former junior Olympian hurdler Jasmine Vaughan. The Phantom boys 4x200 meter relay team has one of the top competing times in Virginia. Their distance runner Victoria Worrall is quickly moving up the ranks.

The Phoebus boys track team won both indoor and outdoor 3A State Championships in 2016. Senior Jalen Williams won the 300-meter hurdles (37.60) and triple jump (45 feet, 3 3/4 inches) and was the long jump runner-up at 21-7 1/2 for 28, scoring 28 individual points at the outdoor championship. On the girls side, the Lady Phantoms placed fifth outdoor, led by Junior Amira Aduma who set meet records in the 100-meter dash (12.23) and the long jump (18-6 1/4), and the 200 (24.74).

Notable alumni
Xavier Adibi (Class of 2003), American football player
La'Keshia Frett (Class of 1993), distinguished professional basketball player and coach
Terri Williams-Flournoy (Class of 1987), college basketball player and coach
Antwoine Womack (Class of 1997), American football player
Tajh Boyd (Class of 2009), former quarterback at Clemson University, American football player for the New York Jets
Wayne Gomes (Class of 1990), retired Major League Baseball player
Margot Lee Shetterly (Class of 1987), African-American non-fiction writer

References

Educational institutions established in 1975
1975 establishments in Virginia
Public high schools in Virginia
Schools in Hampton, Virginia